Dye Branch is a small creek that runs from Duke University's East Campus, through the Trinity Heights, Walltown, and Old West Durham neighborhoods of Durham, North Carolina. From its headwaters near the Food Lion grocery store on Hillsborough Road, Dye Branch (also known as South Ellerbe Creek) flows for three miles (5 km) through some of Durham's oldest and most densely developed neighborhoods: Old West Durham, Walltown, Northgate Park, and Trinity Park. South Ellerbe joins Ellerbe Creek in a small forest—just northwest of the I-85/Roxboro Road interchange. Along some wooded stretches, the creek quietly flows over rocks and is as scenic as any in western North Carolina. In other areas, South Ellerbe is a troubled creek. Its history is marred by rampant pollution and devastating abuse. Though community organizations have arisen to advocate on behalf of the small drainage in recent years, future developments pose significant challenges.

Natural history 
The pre-colonial Dye Branch likely meandered widely throughout the gently rolling woodlands of present-day Durham, NC on its way to Ellerbe Creek. The tiny brook possibly served as a natural center for thirsty flora and fauna. In any case, at the time of European discovery, the native Eno and Occoneechi tribes had already settled the region, and altered the landscape somewhat. Patches of land around the creek were cleared for agriculture and some of the forest burned to increase game. These alterations likely had some impact on Dye Branch, though such limited and disparate deforestation likely had little effect on the health of the Branch as a whole.

European colonization altered the landscape surrounding Dye Branch significantly. By the 18th century, small family farms replaced the forests in North Carolina, as harvested timber became a precious commodity—while streams like Ellerbe Creek were dammed to run newly built mills.

Tobacco’s emergence as a major cash crop transformed small subsistence farming operations into a disparate association of for-profit tract owners. However, the poor soil quality of the Dye Branch region insulated the creek from large land-owners. Dye Branch did not suffer extensive alteration directly by these large farming operations, but its location at the crossroads of these major operations invited the early urbanization that led to Durham’s formation.

By 1880, local businessmen reaped huge profits through the packaging and production of finished tobacco. The Duke family, capitalizing on the “relatively cheap” labor in the south, invested in the development of a massive textile operation geared toward the production of tobacco pouches. This new operation, the Erwin Mill, would prove a turning point, not only in the history of Dye Branch, but also in the history of Durham as a whole.

The building of Erwin Mills in 1893 created the mill village which would one day become Durham. This village and its mill meant devastation for water quality and quantity in Dye Branch for the next 90 years. Erwin Mill, built on the banks of the Dye Branch tributary poured chemical dyes into the small drainage, even as the progressive development of the area meant the small brook began to lose its natural meander. As the 1950s arrived, and the construction of North Carolina’s I-85 came to completion, urban water run-off and impervious surfaces also became sources of creek pollution.

Erwin Mills closed in 1986. Within a few years the Durham Freeway was completed, bisecting the former Erwin Park and Monkey Bottom. Most of the mill buildings were demolished. On part of the site in the late 1980s the Erwin Square office building was erected. By the 1990s, urban housing once centered on the mill and the jobs it provided, dominated the landscape up and down Dye Branch. The nature of the relationship between the small river and its people changed once again. Where Erwin Mill simply used Dye Branch to carry off waste dye, the creek now faced many of the problems associated with all urban streams.

Pollution Problems 
As it flows through Old West Durham, Dye Branch is surrounded by various auto and muffler shops, large surface parking lots, a plumbing shop, funeral home, photo studio, small apartment complex, a chemical storage facility, Southern Railroad, Business Hwy 70, a Duke warehouse, and an old gas station. Many of these sites have direct run-off into the creek. The storm drains in the vicinity lead directly into the creek as well (pairs of storm drains near Hillsborough and Anderson streets are easy to spot).

As it flows through the Walltown neighborhood, the creek has actually cut deeply into the soil, causing property damage, and creating dangers for residents.

There is also a large "dye pond" surrounded by a screened fence near the creek. The dye pond remains from the Erwin textile mill. Run-off from the mill operations used to flow into the neighborhood (apparently, in the past, the area often smelled like a big laundromat from the warm, soapy water that flowed out of the mills).

The troubled creek also flows under the large parking surfaces at Northgate Mall and along the northern edge of Interstate-85 (the widening of this major corridor will have a direct impact on the creek and its surroundings).

Potential risks associated with these pollution sources include possible residues in the water or leaching into the surrounding soil and creek bed.

At its peaceful confluence with Ellerbe Creek, one could almost forget the troubled history of these waters. Few stretches remain that can still be protected. So, any new development would require stronger buffers.

Rivers of Durham County, North Carolina
Rivers of North Carolina
Research Triangle